F.C. Prabis is a Bissau-Guinean football club based in Prabis. They play in the 2 division in Guinean football, the Campeonato Nacional da Guiné-Bissau.

Prabis